Laura Maiztegui (born September 21, 1978) is a field hockey player from Argentina, who won the silver medal with the national women's hockey team at the 2000 Summer Olympics in Sydney.

References

External links
 

1978 births
Living people
Argentine female field hockey players
Las Leonas players
Olympic field hockey players of Argentina
Field hockey players at the 2000 Summer Olympics
Olympic silver medalists for Argentina
Place of birth missing (living people)
Olympic medalists in field hockey
Medalists at the 2000 Summer Olympics
Argentine people of Basque descent